The Croatian Fourth league (or commonly 1. ŽNL) is a county-based fifth level league in the Croatian football league system.

Subdivisions
The teams are divided into 9 county or inter-county subdivisions, competing in a double round-robin format. At the end of each season, the bottom teams are relegated to the respective county's Second league, which are under the 2. ŽNL, while the winners of each league are either promoted directly to the 3. NL or enter a two-legged playoff to gain promotion.

The leagues are:

See also
Croatian football league system

Notes

References 

5
Croa
Croa